Camellia sinensis is a species of evergreen shrub or small tree in the flowering plant family Theaceae. Its leaves and leaf buds are used to produce the popular beverage, tea. Common names include tea plant, tea shrub, and tea tree (unrelated to Melaleuca alternifolia, the source of tea tree oil, or the genus Leptospermum commonly called tea tree).

White tea, yellow tea, green tea, oolong, dark tea (which includes pu-erh tea) and black tea are all harvested from one of two major varieties grown today, C. sinensis var. sinensis and C. s. var. assamica, but are processed differently to attain varying levels of oxidation with black tea being the most oxidized and green being the least. Kukicha (twig tea) is also harvested from C. sinensis, but uses twigs and stems rather than leaves.

Nomenclature and taxonomy 
The generic name Camellia is taken from the Latinized name of Rev. Georg Kamel, SJ (1661–1706), a Moravian-born Jesuit lay brother, pharmacist, and missionary to the Philippines.

Carl Linnaeus chose his name in 1753 for the genus to honor Kamel's contributions to botany (although Kamel did not discover or name this plant, or any Camellia, and Linnaeus did not consider this plant a Camellia but a Thea).

Robert Sweet shifted all formerly Thea species to the genus Camellia in 1818. The name sinensis means "from China" in Latin.

Four varieties of C. sinensis are recognized. Of these, C. sinensis var. sinensis and C. s. var. assamica (JW Masters) Kitamura are most commonly used for tea, and C. s. var. pubilimba Hung T. Chang and C. s. var. dehungensis (Hung T. Chang & BH Chen) TL Ming are sometimes used locally. The Cambodia type tea (C. assamica subsp. lasiocaly) was originally considered a type of assam tea. However, later genetic work showed that it is a hybrid between Chinese small leaf tea and assam type tea.

Tea plants are native to East Asia, and probably originated in the borderlands of north Burma and southwestern China.
 Chinese (small leaf) tea [C. sinensis var. sinensis]
 Chinese Western Yunnan Assam (large leaf) tea [C. sinensis var. assamica]
 Indian Assam (large leaf) tea [C. sinensis var. assamica]
 Chinese Southern Yunnan Assam (large leaf) tea [C. sinensis var. assamica]

Chinese (small leaf) tea may have originated in southern China possibly with hybridization of unknown wild tea relatives. However, since no wild populations of this tea are known, the precise location of its origin is speculative.

Given their genetic differences forming distinct clades, Chinese Assam type tea (C. s. var. assamica) may have two different parentages – one being found in southern Yunnan (Xishuangbanna, Pu'er City) and the other in western Yunnan (Lincang, Baoshan). Many types of Southern Yunnan Assam tea have been hybridized with the closely related species Camellia taliensis. Unlike Southern Yunnan Assam tea, Western Yunnan Assam tea shares many genetic similarities with Indian Assam type tea (also C. s. var. assamica). Thus, Western Yunnan Assam tea and Indian Assam tea both may have originated from the same parent plant in the area where southwestern China, Indo-Burma, and Tibet meet. However, as the Indian Assam tea shares no haplotypes with Western Yunnan Assam tea, Indian Assam tea is likely to have originated from an independent domestication. Some Indian Assam tea appears to have hybridized with the species Camellia pubicosta.

Assuming a generation of 12 years, Chinese small leaf tea is estimated to have diverged from Assam tea around 22,000 years ago, while Chinese Assam tea and Indian Assam tea diverged 2,800 years ago. This divergence tea would correspond to the last glacial maximum.

Chinese small leaf type tea was introduced into India in 1836 by the British and some Indian Assam type tea (e.g. Darjeeling tea) appear to be genetic hybrids of Chinese small leaf type tea, native Indian Assam, and possibly also closely related wild tea species.

Cultivars 
Hundreds, if not thousands of cultivars of C. sinensis are known. Some Japanese cultivars include:
 Benifuuki
 Fushun
 Kanayamidori
 Meiryoku
 Saemidori
 Okumidori
 Yabukita

Description 
Camellia sinensis is native to East Asia, the Indian Subcontinent, and Southeast Asia, but it is today cultivated all around the world in tropical and subtropical regions. It is an evergreen shrub or small tree that is usually trimmed to below  when cultivated for its leaves. It has a strong taproot. The flowers are yellow-white,  in diameter, with seven or eight petals.

The seeds of C. sinensis and C. oleifera can be pressed to yield tea oil, a sweetish seasoning and cooking oil that should not be confused with tea tree oil, an essential oil that is used for medical and cosmetic purposes, and originates from the leaves of a different plant.

Fresh leaves contain about 4% caffeine, as well as related compounds including theobromine. The young, light-green leaves are preferably harvested for tea production; they have short, white hairs on the underside. Older leaves are deeper green. Different leaf ages produce differing tea qualities, since their chemical compositions are different. Usually, the tip (bud) and the first two to three leaves are harvested for processing. This hand picking is repeated every one to two weeks.

In 2017, Chinese scientists sequenced the genome of C. s. var. assamica. It contains about three billion base pairs, which was larger than most plants previously sequenced.

Cultivation 

Camellia sinensis is mainly cultivated in tropical and subtropical climates, in areas with at least 127 cm (50 in) of rainfall a year. Tea plants prefer a rich and moist growing location in full to part sun, and can be grown in hardiness zones 7 – 9. However, the clonal one is commercially cultivated from the equator to as far north as Cornwall and Scotland on the UK mainland.

Tea plants will grow into a tree if left undisturbed, but cultivated plants are pruned to waist height for ease of plucking. Two principal varieties are used, the small-leaved Chinese variety plant (C. s. sinensis) and the large-leaved Assamese plant (C. s. assamica), used mainly for black tea.

Chinese teas 
It is native to southeast China. The first tea plant variety to be discovered, recorded, and used to produce tea dates back 3,000 years ago; it yields some of the most popular teas.

C. s. var. waldenae was considered a different species, C. waldenae by SY Hu, but it was later identified as a variety of C. sinensis. This variety is commonly called Waldenae Camellia. It is seen on Sunset Peak and Tai Mo Shan in Hong Kong. It is also distributed in the Guangxi province.

Indian teas 
Three main kinds of tea are produced in India:
 Assam, from the var. assamica plant, comes from the near sea-level heavily forested northeastern section of India, the state of Assam. Tea from here is rich and full-bodied. The first tea estates of India was established in Assam in 1837. Teas are manufactured in either the orthodox process or the CTC process. 
 Darjeeling, from the var. sinensis plant, is from the cool and wet Darjeeling highland region, tucked in the foothills of the Himalayas. The tea is delicately flavored, and considered to be one of the finest teas in the world. The Darjeeling plantations have three distinct harvests, termed 'flushes', and the tea produced from each flush has a unique flavor. First (spring) flush teas are light and aromatic, while the second (summer) flush produces tea with a bit more bite. The third, or autumn flush gives a tea that is lesser in quality.
 Nilgiri is from a southern region of India almost as high as Darjeeling.

Pests and diseases 

Tea leaves are eaten by some herbivores, such as the caterpillars of the willow beauty (Peribatodes rhomboidaria), a geometer moth.

Health effects 

Although health benefits have been assumed throughout the history of using tea as a common beverage, no high-quality evidence shows that tea confers significant benefits. In clinical research over the early 21st century, tea has been studied extensively for its potential to lower the risk of human diseases, but none of this research is conclusive as of 2017.

Biosynthesis of caffeine 
Caffeine, a molecule produced in C. sinensis, functions as a secondary metabolite and acts as a natural pesticide: it can paralyze and kill herbivorous insects feeding on the plant. Caffeine is a purine alkaloid and its biosynthesis occurs in young tea leaves and is regulated by several enzymes. The biosynthetic pathway in C. sinensis differs from other caffeine-producing plants such as coffee or guayusa. Analysis of the pathway was carried out by harvesting young leaves and using reverse transcription PCR to analyze the genes encoding the major enzymes involved in synthesizing caffeine. The gene TCS1 encodes caffeine synthase. Younger leaves feature high concentrations of TCS1 transcripts, allowing more caffeine to be synthesized during this time. Dephosphorylation of xanthosine-5'-monophosphate into xanthosine is the committed step for the xanthosines entering the beginning of the most common pathway. A sequence of reactions turns xanthosine (9β--ribofuranosylxanthine) into 7-methylxanthosine, then 7-methylxanthine, then theobromine (3,7-dimethylxanthine), and finally into caffeine (1,3,7-trimethylxanthine).

See also 

 Chinese herbology
 Green tea extract
 International Code of Nomenclature for Cultivated Plants
 ISO 3103, a method of brewing tea according to the ISO
 Kaempferol, a flavanoid found in tea and associated with reduced risk of heart disease
 List of tea companies
 Tasseography, a method of divination by reading tea leaves.
 Tea classics
 Tea production in Sri Lanka
 Turkish tea
 Tea production in Kenya
 Tea leaf grading
 Camellia taliensis

Primary green tea catechins

References

External links 

 
 Camellia sinensis from Purdue University
 The International Camellia Society
 Plant Cultures: botany and history of the tea plant 
 Jac.OxfordJournals.org, The effect of a component of tea (Camellia sinensis) on methicillin resistance in Staphylococcus.
 Suns.Ars-Grin.gov, List of Chemicals in Camellia sinensis (Dr. Duke's Databases)

Medicinal plants
Medicinal plants of Asia
Tea
sinensis
Plants used in traditional Chinese medicine
Caffeine
Plants described in 1753
Taxa named by Carl Linnaeus
Flora of Assam (region)